Soe Maung is a Burmese politician and retired army general. He served as a Minister of the President's Office in Thein Sein's Cabinet along with five other ministers. He is a retired Major General in the Myanmar Army and a former Judge Advocate General. He is a graduate of the Defence Services Academy.

In August 2018, Soe Maung registered a new political party, Democratic Party of National Politics (DNP), in the leadup to the 2020 Myanmar general election, along with another former military officer and Auditor-General, Lun Maung. DNP has faced allegations of being a proxy party for the military-operated Union Solidarity and Development Party because of Soe Maung's close ties to Than Shwe. Soe Maung is also a chair of Ra Hta Pa La Association (from), a nationalist organization.

Personal life 
Soe Maung is married to Nang Phyu Phyu Aye. His adopted son, Zaw Win Shein, is a businessman who established Ayeyar Hinthar Holdings in 2006.

References

Government ministers of Myanmar
People from Magway Division
Burmese military personnel
1952 births
Living people
Defence Services Academy alumni
Burmese generals
Union Solidarity and Development Party politicians
Members of Pyithu Hluttaw